Fred Cooke may refer to:

 Fred Cooke (baseball), American baseball player
 Fred Cooke (footballer), English footballer
 Fred Cooke (comedian), Irish comedian and actor

See also
 Frederick Cooke, Australian politician
 Frederick Cooke (socialist), New Zealand tailor, socialist and trade unionist